The Treaty of Hoe Buckintoopa was signed on August 31, 1803 between the Choctaw (an American Indian tribe) and the United States Government.

Terms

The preamble begins with,

1. Receive fifteen pieces of strouds, three rifles, one hundred and fifty blankets, two hundred and fifty pounds.

Signatories

James Wilkinson, Mingo Pooscoos, Alatala Hooma.

See also

List of Choctaw Treaties
Treaty of Hopewell
Treaty of Fort Adams
Treaty of Fort Confederation
Treaty of Mount Dexter
Treaty of Fort St. Stephens
Treaty of Doak's Stand
Treaty of Washington City
Treaty of Dancing Rabbit Creek
List of treaties

Citations

External links
Indian Affairs: Laws and Treaties (Treaty with the Choctaw, 1803)

Hoe Buckintoopa
1803 treaties
1803 in the United States